Imbuia may refer to:
Ocotea porosa, a species of tree belonging to the laurel family
Imbuia, Santa Catarina, a Brazilian municipality in the state of Santa Catarina